Professor Vladimir Abashev (April 21, 1954-) is a Russian philologist from Perm Krai and a Professor of Perm State University.

In 1978 he graduated from the Philological Faculty of Perm State University and since 1987 he has been working in the university in the department of Russian literature. From 1991 to 1996 he was head of the department. In 1995 he helped established the Russian Literature Research Laboratory,  one of the largest centers for the study of the cultural life of Russian provinces.

References

1954 births
Living people
People from Altai Krai
Russian philologists
Perm State University alumni
Academic staff of Perm State University